The Royal Institution of Chartered Surveyors (RICS) is a global professional body for those working in the Built Environment, Construction, Land, Property and Real Estate.  The RICS was founded in London in 1868. It works at a cross-governmental level, and aims to promote and enforce the highest international standards in the valuation, management and development of land, real estate, construction and infrastructure.

Founded as the Institution of Surveyors, it received a royal charter in 1881, and in 1947 became the Royal Institution of Chartered Surveyors. With a London HQ and regional offices across the United Kingdom, plus international offices, it serves a 134,000-strong membership distributed over nearly 150 countries. The RICS is linked to other national surveying institutions, collaborates with other professional bodies, and, in 2013, was a founder member of a coalition to develop the International Property Measurement Standards (IPMS). It also produces cost information and professional guidance on valuation and other activities.

In September 2021, an independent review exposed poor governance practices at the highest levels of the RICS organisation, prompting the resignations of the president, chief executive, interim chair of the governing council, and chair of the management board, in addition to the earlier resignation of the chief operating officer. The report was labelled an "appalling advert for our profession on the world stage". A subsequent review published in June 2022 demanded a "transformation of the institution carried out at pace".

History 
RICS was founded in London, England, as the Institution of Surveyors after a meeting of 49 surveyors at the Westminster Palace Hotel on 15 June 1868. The inaugural president was John Clutton (who founded Cluttons, a property firm still in business today). The organisation has occupied headquarters on the corner of Great George Street and Little George Street since then. It received a Royal charter as The Surveyors' Institution on 26 August 1881, The charter required RICS to "promote the usefulness of the profession for the public advantage in the UK and in other parts of the world."

The Surveyors' Institution became the Chartered Surveyors' Institution in 1930. In 1946, George VI granted the title "Royal" and in 1947 the professional body became the Royal Institution of Chartered Surveyors.

The RICS (with the CIOB, CIBSE, IstructE and RIBA) was a founder member of the Building Industry Council, today the Construction Industry Council, in 1988.

International presence

RICS headquarters is in London with its main support functions in Birmingham. There are regional offices in the United Kingdom, across mainland Europe, in China, Singapore, Australia, the Middle East, Sub-Saharan Africa, North America and Brazil.

In 2018, there are RICS-qualified professionals in nearly 150 countries. RICS accredits 134,000 (as of September 2021) qualified and trainee professionals worldwide. The majority of accredited individuals are still based in the United Kingdom with large numbers also in mainland Europe, Australia and Hong Kong. There is now a strong growth globally, particularly in China, India and the Americas.

RICS has close links with many national surveying institutions and is a founding member association of the  International Federation of Surveyors (FIG). Within RICS the primary areas of practice represented at FIG are geomatics (land and hydrographic survey), environment, planning, construction and valuation.

RICS works in close collaboration with other professional bodies, central banks and international organisations such as The United Nations, World Bank and The European Union.

International standards

In 2013, RICS was a founder member of the coalition to develop International Property Measurement Standards, which launched its first standard – for measuring office space – in November 2014. It launched its second standard, for measuring residential buildings, in September 2016. In 2014 RICS was a founder member of the coalition to develop International Ethics Standards, standards designed to add greater consistency to developing and reinforcing professional ethics globally – these launched in December 2016.

To add greater consistency to the benchmarking, measuring, and reporting of construction project costs, International Construction Measurement Standards were published in July 2017. The coalition for International Land Measurement Standards – aiding consistency of interpretation and documentation of tenure – launched in June 2016. In each case, coalition member bodies are committed to implementing the new standards through training and guidance for professional practitioners.

The RICS is a founder member of the International Valuation Standards Committee.

Membership
Entry to membership of RICS is via four main routes: academic; graduate; technical; and senior professional. RICS has links with universities worldwide, with whom they have accredited approved courses which satisfy part of the qualification requirements to become trainee surveyors. RICS also offers expedited routes to membership for qualified professional members of some partner associations.

RICS requires members to update their knowledge and competence during their working life through Continuing Professional Development. Professionals holding RICS qualifications may use the following designations after their name:
AssocRICS (Associate); previously members at this level were known as Technical Members and used the designation "TechRICS"
MRICS (Member); previously members at this level were known as Professional Associates and used the designation "ARICS"
FRICS (Fellow)
HonRICS (Honorary members)
Those with the designation MRICS or FRICS are also known as Chartered Surveyors and variations such as "Chartered Building Surveyor", "Chartered Valuation Surveyor" or "Chartered Quantity Surveyor", depending on their chosen specialist qualifications and field of expertise.

Both AssocRICS and MRICS require the collation of a candidate's training and work experience to be assessed by RICS trained assessors,
although some may be eligible for direct entry based on international qualifications. MRICS has a higher technical bar to entry and there is an academic prerequisite which does not exist for AssocRICS.
MRICS applications are also subject to an Assessment of Professional Competence (APC) interview, held by a panel of Chartered Surveyors where the candidate's experience, knowledge and technical skill is assessed during the interview. FRICS is the highest accolade awarded and demonstrates the professional achievements of an individual. It is an honoured class of membership awarded and an international measure of excellence. Only those who hold the MRICS designation are eligible to apply for FRICS and they must meet the required number of professional characteristics.

Professional groups
RICS specifies areas of specialism, each with its own professional group, clustered into Land, Property and Construction. Within each professional group there may be further specialisms.

Specialist accreditations
RICS aims to cover, among its practising members, property and construction related expertise generally. Specialised areas of practice expertise for which accreditation is available include:

Building Information Modelling (BIM) Manager Certification
Building Conservation
Chartered Environmentalists
Dispute Resolution
ECO Assessor Certification
Fixed Charge Receivership Scheme
Valuer Registration.

RICS Matrics
The junior branch of RICS, known as Matrics (pronounced "matrix"), provides educational support, charitable and networking activities for surveying students, trainee surveyors (of any age) and Chartered Surveyors with ten years or less post-qualification experience. It comprises some 40 local groups across the United Kingdom. Established in 1889 as the Junior Committee, it became the "Junior Organisation" ("JO") in 1928 and was re-branded as "RICS Matrics" in 2003. It also has links with the Young Chartered Surveyors in the Republic of Ireland.

Governance
The RICS is governed by a governing council, to which report a management board, a standards and regulation board, and an audit committee.

2019-2021 governance review
In January 2021, the RICS reversed a decision to suppress a 2019 BDO report critical of the organisation's financial governance. According to the Sunday Times, four non-executive directors had expressed concerns about the report's findings, but were dismissed in November 2019 by then president Chris Brooke. Following a letter from four past presidents, the RICS initially rejected an independent review, but, after the ousted directors also wrote a letter, then said its governing council would "revisit" the issue, and on 22 January 2021 announced it would initiate an independent inquiry into the affair. In 2019, RICS finances were reported to have been in a difficult position, the organisation having made a pre-tax loss of £4.7m on £91.3m of income from fees and commercial activities. It subsequently made 140 people redundant. In February 2021, the RICS president Kathleen Fontana said that, in addition to the independent review into the audit report, the governing council was agreeing a strategic review into the institution's governance and member engagement. Building reported member views that expensive membership fees did not reflect the benefits they receive, and that RICS' international expansion had been "at the expense of its core UK membership, which feels disengaged and neglected".

In April 2021, Peter Oldham, the chair of the independent review of RICS's governance resigned "for professional reasons", to be replaced by Alison Levitt QC with completion delayed to June 2021 – later pushed back to mid-August 2021. On 4 June 2021, Building reported the "surprise" resignation and immediate departure of RICS' chief operating officer Violetta Parylo amid "a storm of calls" from members for reform. The RICS review of its purpose and relevance had been published in May 2021. Based on 9,000 responses, it reported members' trust in the RICS had plummeted by nearly a third, while satisfaction with membership had fallen to a historic low of 43%.

Levitt review
Levitt's governance review was delivered to the RICS in early August but not immediately made public, prompting calls for its full publication; the report was first reviewed by a five-strong subgroup of RICS's 26-member governing council. Property Week columnist Peter Bill said "a private tiff has ballooned into a crisis of confidence in the 130,000-member institution" with a defensive management facing a small but powerful group of disaffected members. After the August departure of RICS managing director Matthew Howell, RICS CEO Sean Tompkins resigned on 9 September 2021, when the full Levitt Review was published; Tompkins also forfeited a £190,000 bonus payment. In light of the Review findings, RICS president Kathleen Fontana, the interim chair of the governing council Chris Brooke, and management board chair Paul Marcuse also resigned, and RICS terminated its relationship with London law firm Fieldfisher, criticised by Levitt for being "demonstrably and inappropriately partisan."

Levitt said the RICS had made it "as difficult as possible" for people to contact the review; "RICS management and others on occasion" gave an "impression of reluctant acquiescence" during her investigations, she said. Her 467-page report concluded that the four non-executive board members had been wrongly dismissed and that sound governance principles were not followed. The CEO and COO thus operated with little effective scrutiny and become resistant to challenge amid "a power struggle". Levitt recommended "a wide-ranging external review of purpose, governance and strategy, led by an independent reviewer", plus interim recommendations relating to governance, executive remuneration, whistle-blowing and legal advice. The RICS governing council committed to apologise to the dismissed non-executive directors, and to implement all the report's recommendations. On 30 September 2021, Building reported on a "grovelling public apology" from the RICS to the wrongfully dismissed non-executive directors, and said an external review of the institution's future purpose was set to start within weeks. The ousted non-executive directors welcomed the formal apology but said it was "difficult to accept it as a statement of genuine contrition".

Gleeds chairman and Building columnist Richard Steer called the governance scandal an "appalling advert for our profession on the world stage" and said RICS needed to undergo a "complete restructuring". Paul Roberts, MD of global law firm Secretariat, said all 21 members of the RICS's governing council should be removed and replaced with new blood elected by the RICS membership.

In October 2021, the RICS refused a request by 40 former and current employees to launch an investigation into how the institution selected staff to be furloughed during the COVID-19 pandemic. The employees group alleged that some staff were furloughed as RICS had considered them too supportive of the institution’s membership, and sought a review of RICS's human resource procedures, but RICS refused, considering the matter closed.

The Cabinet Office provided advice on suitable individuals to lead the review of the RICS's future purpose. In December 2021, the RICS announced former senior civil servant Michael Bichard would lead a six-month review into its governance and future purpose, with three objectives set by the RICS's governing council: to "create clarity" about the RICS' purpose, to propose how the organisation could be a "beacon for best practice" in governance, transparency and accountability, and to ensure that governance is "fit for today" and could remain relevant in future.

Bichard review
The 68-page Bichard review, recommending sweeping reforms, was published on 21 June 2022. It said the future success of the organisation would "require nothing less than a transformation of the institution carried out at pace"; the need for change was "urgent" and "unarguable". Bichard's recommendations included: a renewed and increased focus on the public interest remit of RICS, including amending the Royal Charter and creating a public interest panel to advise the RICS's Governing Council; maintaining self-regulation, through greater independence for regulatory functions; increased focus on diversity and inclusion; empowering and enabling members through greater support for regional boards, alongside increased member engagement, with renewed focus on younger members; an independent review of RICS's governance and effectiveness at delivering against its Charter for the public advantage once every five years; a new simplified, clear, accountable governance structure; and greater leadership on major society issues such as sustainability and climate change. Bichard also said the RICS should seek to continue to increase its influence overseas - a policy that was "very contentious" among the institution’s 140,000 members.

Bichard said: "My aim has been to help create a new sense of purpose and direction so that RICS can once more stand tall as an exemplar professional institution, capable of tackling the challenges which will shape the way we all live our lives in the years to come. Issues such as climate change and sustainability, improving the built environment and building safety all sit within the remit of RICS and will benefit from the contribution which a revitalised RICS could make."

Nick Maclean, interim chair of RICS's governing council, said: "The Bichard RICS Review represents a watershed moment for the institution, and a key point in time which sets out a path for permanent improvement. Implementation of the recommendations will provide a solid accountable structure to effectively support our professionals and work in the public interest. RICS governing council strongly endorses the recommendations, and will implement these proposals." McLean was set to stand down on 5 October 2022, his role being abolished as part of Bichard's recommendations; the chief executive role would also be replaced by a new director general.

In August 2022, Bichard was appointed as interim senior independent governor through to 31 December 2023, responsible for scrutinising the actions of the RICS' governing council and committees. In December 2022, the RICS announced the establishment of a new board to oversee day-to-day operations and deliver the governing council's strategic plan. It is to be chaired by former CBRE Group director Martin Samworth. He will also review proposed changes to constitutional documents, including the RICS's Royal Charter, recommended in Bichard's review.

Governance review over fire safety
In January 2022, the Department for Levelling Up, Housing and Communities was reporting to be planning legislation to enable regular reviews of the RICS's governance. Ministers were said to be frustrated by a RICS decision in December 2021 to maintain its valuation advice requiring External Wall System forms (EWS1s) on blocks under 18m high. Richard Collins, the RICS's interim CEO, publicly questioned the need for the proposed new law to monitor RICS's governance.

Presidents
The first president was John Clutton, who was elected in 1868. The first female president was Louise Brooke-Smith, who was elected in 2014.

Guidance

BCIS

BCIS, the Building Cost Information Service, was established in 1962 and provides independent cost and price information to the construction industry and others needing comprehensive, accurate and independent data.

Isurv

Isurv is an online information service for expertise in natural and built environments. Launched by the RICS in September 2003, it provides insight from verified legal experts and industry practitioners relating to construction.

Rental valuation of public houses, bars, restaurants and nightclubs in England and Wales 
The primary RICS professional guidance on this subject is covered at VPGA 4 Valuation. It provides practical assistance to valuers dealing with public houses which are valued and assessed in a completely different way other commercial businesses.

Public houses are valued by the profits method of valuation, often referred to as Fair Maintainable Trade Or Turnover (FMT). The FMT method applies to tens of thousands of commercial properties in England and Wales and is the basis of rateable valuation by the Valuation Office Agency, who also follow this method. RICS guidance ('The Red Book') emphasises that a valuer specialising in such valuations are regularly involved in the market, as practical knowledge of the factors affecting the market is essential to analysis of comparable transactions.

Charitable works
Lionheart is the benevolent fund for past and present RICS members and their families. The charity was established in 1899 and provides financial support, health and well-being packages, and work-related counselling and befriending support. RICS also supports the Chartered Surveyors Training Trust, which helps young people enter the profession through apprenticeships; Charity Property Help, which provides property advice to charities and voluntary organisations, and The Chartered Surveyors' Voluntary Service (CSVS), a registered charity providing free property advice to people who would otherwise struggle to access professional assistance.

See also 
Chartered Institution of Civil Engineering Surveyors
Remote Sensing and Photogrammetry Society

Notes

References

External links
 RICS website
 AIQS website

1868 establishments in the United Kingdom
Housing in the United Kingdom
Interested parties in planning in the United Kingdom
Organisations based in London with royal patronage
Organisations based in the City of Westminster
Organizations established in 1868
Chartered Surveyors
Professional valuation organizations
Real estate valuation
Real estate-related professional associations
Surveying organizations
Grade II listed buildings in the City of Westminster
Home inspection